Pelodiscus maackii, commonly known as the Amur softshell turtle or the northern Chinese softshell turtle, is a species of turtle in the family Trionychidae. The species is found in the Russian Far East, northeastern China, Korea, and Japan. It is possible that the Japanese populations are the result of ancient introductions by humans.

Breeding
In China specifically the breeding of the Chinese soft turtle has been done for over 2400 years and the production has come to 340,000 Annually due to the demand.

Etymology
The specific name, maackii, is in honor of Russian naturalist Richard Maack.

References

Further reading
Brandt JF (1857). "Observationes quaedam ad generis Trionychum species duas novas spectantes ". Bulletin de la Classe Physico-Mathématique de l'Académie Impériale des Sciences de Saint-Pétersbourg 16: 110–111. (Trionyx maackii, new species). (in Latin).
Stejneger L (1907). Herpetology of Japan and Adjacent Territory. Smithsonian Institution, United States National Museum Bulletin 58. Washington, District of Columbia: Government Printing Office. xx + 577 pp. (Amyda maackii, p. 529).

Pelodiscus
Turtles of Asia
Reptiles of China
Reptiles of Korea
Reptiles of Russia
Fauna of the Russian Far East
Reptiles described in 1857
Taxa named by Johann Friedrich von Brandt